Brooks Hollow is a valley in Reynolds County in the U.S. state of Missouri.

Brooks Hollow has the name of William Brooks, the original owner of the site.

See also
List of rivers of Missouri

References

Valleys of Missouri